Sven Brus (born 1941) is a Swedish Christian democratic politician, member of the Riksdag 2000–2006.

References

1941 births
Date of birth missing (living people)
Living people
Members of the Riksdag 1998–2002
Members of the Riksdag 2002–2006
Members of the Riksdag from the Christian Democrats (Sweden)
Place of birth missing (living people)